Millers is a hamlet split between the town of Somerset in Niagara County and the town of Yates in Orleans County, New York, United States.

References

Hamlets in New York (state)
Hamlets in Niagara County, New York
Hamlets in Orleans County, New York